The Jazz Singer is a 1952 remake of the famous 1927 talking picture The Jazz Singer. It stars Danny Thomas, Peggy Lee, and Eduard Franz, and was nominated for an Oscar for best musical score. The film follows about the same storyline as the version starring Al Jolson. It was also distributed by Warner Bros. Pictures.

Plot summary
As Jerry Golding (a young Korean War veteran) scales the heights of show business, he breaks the heart of his father, who had hoped that Jerry would instead follow in the footsteps of six consecutive generations of cantors in their family. Sorrowfully, Cantor David Golding reads the Kaddish service, indicating that, so far as he is concerned, his son is dead. A tearful reconciliation occurs when Jerry dutifully returns to sing the "Kol Nidre" in his ailing father's absence.

Main cast

Production
Eduard Franz, who played the role of the aged and ailing cantor battling his son, would go on to reprise his role in the television version of the story starring Jerry Lewis that would be broadcast just seven years later in 1959.

Accolades

References

External links
 
 

1952 films
1952 drama films
1950s romantic musical films
American musical drama films
American romantic drama films
American romantic musical films
Remakes of American films
Films scored by Max Steiner
Films scored by Ray Heindorf
Films about Jews and Judaism
Films about music and musicians
American films based on plays
Films directed by Michael Curtiz
Warner Bros. films
1950s musical drama films
1950s English-language films
1950s American films